Chitra Kamaraj (2 May 1992 – 9 December 2020), better known as V. J. Chitra, was an former leading television Indian actress and anchor. She rose to fame with her role in the Tamil soap opera Pandian Stores, and made her film acting debut in Calls (2021). She is known well for her appearance in shows such as Vilayadu Vaagai Soodu (2012), Sattam Solvathu Enna? (2013), Saravanan Meenatchi (season 2) (2013-16), Nodiku Nodi Athiradi (2014), Oor Suthalaam Vaanga (2014), Mannan Magal (2014), En Samayal Araiyil (2014), Ossthi Comedy Kusthi (2014), Ring O Ring (2014), Chinna Papa Periya Papa (2014-18),  Darling Darling (2016-17), Dance Jodi Dance Season 1 (2016-17), Saravanan Meenatchi (season 3) (2017), Velunachi (2018) and Pandian Stores (2018-20).

On 9 December 2020, Chitra was found dead in a hotel room in Nazarethpettai at 9:32 am. Reports and autopsy results suggest that Chitra died from Suicide by hanging later resulting in a deliberate suicide. Rumors later suggest that Chitra was murdered by her soon to be husband Hemanth Ravi however that rumors were investigated and proven as false. On 15 December 2020, Hemanth was suspected and later proven guilty of abetting her suicide and was later arrested and charged with criminal offenses. However police officers are still currently investigating the whole case.

Career 
Chitra Kamaraj was born on 2 May 1992 in Chennai. Before becoming a full-time actor, she was a television host. After seeing Chitra host a television show, actress Raadhika reached out with an offer for her to act in Radaan Mediaworks' production Chinna Papa Periya Papa (2016) alongside senior actresses Nirosha and Nalini. The success of the series prompted her to sign up for other shows including Saravanan Meenatchi, Velunachi. In Pandian Stores, Chitra portrayed the character Mullai, which became popular among the audience, the role was replaced by Kaavya Arivumani after her death.

Chitra signed on to appear in her first film role in mid-2019 through Calls (2021). The film would feature her as a business process outsourcing professional and was shot in late 2019. It also marked her only film appearance in her life.

Personal life 
Chitra got engaged to Hemanth Ravi, a businessman, in August 2020 and got register married in October 2020. Her wedding was scheduled to be in February 2021 before her death.

Filmography

Television performances

Film appearance

Awards

References 

1992 births
2020 deaths
21st-century Indian actresses
Actresses from Chennai
Female models from Chennai
Tamil television actresses
2020 suicides
Suicides by hanging in India